Holocaust theology is a body of theological and philosophical debate concerning the role of God in the universe in light of the Holocaust of the late 1930s and early 1940s. It is primarily found in Judaism. Jews were killed in higher proportions than other groups; some scholars limit the definition of the Holocaust to the Jewish victims of the Nazis as Jews alone were targeted for the Final Solution. Others include the additional five million non-Jewish victims, bringing the total to about 11 million. One third of the total worldwide Jewish population were killed during the Holocaust. The Eastern European Jewish population was particularly hard hit, being reduced by ninety percent. While a disproportionate number of Jewish religious scholars were killed, more than eighty percent of the world's total, the perpetrators of the Holocaust did not merely target religious Jews. A large percentage of the Jews killed both in Eastern and Western Europe were either nonobservant or had not received even an elementary level of Jewish education.

Judaism, Christianity, and Islam have traditionally taught that God is omniscient (all-knowing), omnipotent (all-powerful), and omnibenevolent (all-good) in nature. However, these views are in apparent contrast with the injustice and suffering in the world. Monotheists seek to reconcile this view of God with the existence of evil and suffering. In so doing, they are confronting what is known as the problem of evil. One solution to the problem of evil is dualism, which envisions a second God with evil characteristics. Another solution is to propose that God is actually an evil entity with the goal of increasing suffering in the world.

Within all of the monotheistic faiths many answers (theodicies) have been proposed. In light of the magnitude of depravity seen in the Holocaust, many people have also re-examined classical views on this subject. A common question raised in Holocaust theology is "How can people still have any kind of faith after the Holocaust?"

A scholarly literature, including a variety of anthologies and commentaries, has developed that reflects upon Holocaust theology as a religio-cultural phenomenon.

Orthodox Jewish responses

Biblical origin
Although the risks and obstacles were great, the promise of the covenant, already with the Jewish patriarchs and for the Land of Israel, is held up as eternally sealed in holiness:

To the point of destroying them: LeKhaLotam (לכלתם, to destroy them) also implies KhaLah (כלה, desire and yearning); God is saying, "Even though you have sinned, I do not despise you, because you still desire to serve Me" (Likutey Halakhot V).

Many have identified Hitler as an Amalekite. According to the Hebrew Bible, Amalek lived in Canaan: "Amalek dwells in the south land" (Numbers 13:29). The Israelites were instructed to kill all those who dwelled in Canaan: "thou shalt save alive nothing that breathes" (Deuteronomy 19:16) otherwise "I shall do to you, as I thought to do to them" (Numbers 33:56). Amalek and Israel were archenemies, their enmity originating from the Battle of Refidim, where the Amalekites targeted and killed weak Israelites. As a result, God decreed Amalek to be obliterated "from beneath the heavens" (Deuteronomy 25:19). The Hebrew Bible connects "Haman the son of Hammedatha the Agagite" (Esther 3:1), the genocidal antagonist of the Book of Esther, to Agag, king of Amalek, whom the Israelites failed to kill (I Samuel 15:9). According to these verses Hitler may be seen as a result of this failure. However, Hitler could also be seen as a "symbolic" Amalekite.

Haredi and Hardal
Satmar leader Joel Teitelbaum writes:Because of our sinfulness we have suffered greatly, suffering as bitter as wormwood, worse than any Israel has known since it became a people.... In former times, whenever troubles befell Jacob, the matter was pondered and reasons sought—which sin had brought the troubles about—so that we could make amends and return to the Lord, may He be blessed.... But in our generation one need not look far for the sin responsible for our calamity.... The heretics have made all kinds of efforts to violate these oaths, to go up by force and to seize sovereignty and freedom by themselves, before the appointed time.... [They] have lured the majority of the Jewish people into awful heresy, the likes of which have not been seen since the world was created.... And so it is no wonder that the Lord has lashed out in anger.... And there were also righteous people who perished because of the iniquity of the sinners and corrupters, so great was the [divine] wrath.

The well-known Lithuanian Jewish leader, Rabbi Elazar Shach taught that the Holocaust was a divine punishment for the sins of the Jewish people, and for the abandoning of religious observance for the enlightenment. He caused outrage in the secular Israeli media when he stated that "the Holy One, blessed be He, kept score for hundreds of years until it added up to six million Jews". In his defence, Haredi MKs said his comments had been misconstrued, and were not meant to justify Nazi atrocities. Shach believed that the secularism of some Israelis would cause another Holocaust, and he once said that if the Education Ministry were to be placed in the hands of Meretz MK Shulamit Aloni, it would result in "over a million Israeli children being forced into apostasy, and that would be worse than what had happened to Jewish children during the Holocaust". Wishing to prevent deviation from the established order of prayers, he opposed the composition of new prayers to commemorate the victims of the Holocaust.
There were Messianist Zionists, at the other end of the spectrum, who also saw the Holocaust as a collective punishment for ongoing Jewish unfaithfulness to God. Mordecai Atiyah was a leading advocate of this idea. Zvi Yehuda Kook and his disciples, for their part, avoided this harsh position, but they too theologically related the Holocaust to the Jewish recognition of God's divine wrath upon them. Kook writes: "When the end comes and Israel fails to recognize it, there comes a cruel divine operation that removes [the Jewish people] from its exile.

Chaim Ozer Grodzinski, in 1939, stated that the Nazi persecution of the Jews was the fault of non-Orthodox Jews (Achiezer, volume III, Vilna 1939). Eliyahu Eliezer Dessler had similar views.

Both Meir Kahane and Avigdor Miller have written extensively in defense of God during the Holocaust, while criticizing the European Jewish community's abandonment of traditional Jewish values.

Chabad 

In 1980, Menachem Mendel Schneerson, the seventh Rebbe of Chabad Lubavitch wrote:

"It is clear that 'no evil descends from Above,' and buried within torment and suffering is a core of exalted spiritual good. Not all human beings are able to perceive it, but it is very much there. So it is not impossible for the physical destruction of the Holocaust to be spiritually beneficial. On the contrary, it is quite possible that physical affliction is good for the spirit" ("Mada Ve'emuna," Machon Lubavitch, 1980, Kfar Chabad)

He then went on to compare it to a Surgeon who amputates limbs to save the life of a patient:

"[The limb] is incurably diseased... God, like the professor-surgeon... seeks the good of Israel, and indeed, all He does is done for the good.... In the spiritual sense, no harm was done, because the everlasting spirit of the Jewish people was not destroyed." ("Mada Ve'emuna," Machon Lubavitch, 1980, Kfar Chabad)

Schneerson's positive portrayal of the Holocaust proved unpopular and generated considerable controversy. The notion that suffering should be lovingly accepted was seen as insulting to the victims and offensive to survivors, since Schneerson suggests that somehow the victims deserved their fate and that Hitler was an instrument of God.

In latter years he would say that no explanation that human reason can provide can afford a satisfactory theodicy of Auschwitz, especially no explanation along the lines of divine punition. In his published discourses, for example, the following critique of any rational Auschwitz theodicy is to be found.

In our own times, the destruction of six million Jews that took place with such great and terrible cruelty—a tremendous desolation the likes of which never was (and never will be, may the Merciful One save us!) throughout all generations—cannot be considered a matter of punishment for transgressions, for even the Satan himself could not configure a calculus of transgressions for that generation which could justify—Heaven forbid!—a punishment so severe. There is no rational explanation and no elucidation based on Torah wisdom whatsoever for the Devastation, nothing but the knowledge that "thus it arises in My [God's] Mind!" and "It is a decree before Me." And even then, it is certainly not in the sense of a divine desire or innermost will of God—Heaven forbid!—for, as it says in Torah, "When man suffers, what does the Shekhinah [the Divine Presence] say? 'My head is too heavy for me, etc.'" [Sanhedrin 46a . It is but "for a small moment that have I forsaken thee" [[[Book of Isaiah|Is.]] 54:7]). And most certainly there is no explanation in terms of punishment for sins. On the contrary, all those who were killed in the Desolation are called kedoshim [holy ones] ... because they were killed in sanctification of God's Name (on account of being Jews) […]

The same approach, in which all forms of rational theodicy are categorically rejected, is adopted by Schneerson in his correspondence with Elie Wiesel (R. M. M. Schneerson, Iggerot Hakodesh, no. 8969, 23:370–371).

 ...it is no mere coincidence that all authentic questioners [like Abraham and Moses] remained by their trust in God. For it could in no way be otherwise. Why so? If only the problem is meant with truth, and it is the expression and product of a true feeling of justice and uprightness, then it is logical that such a deep feeling can only come from being convinced that true justice is the justice that stems from a super-human source, that is, from something higher than both human intellect and human feeling. [...] after the initial tempestuous assault [on God by the sufferer], he has to see that the entire process of posing the problem and of wishing to understand with the intellect that which is higher than the intellect, is something that cannot take place. Moreover, he must—after a rattling outrage and a thorough grieving—ultimately come to the conclusion: Nevertheless I remain confident [ani maamin]. On the contrary: even more strongly!

Works of Jewish theologians

Richard Rubenstein
Prof. Richard Rubenstein's original piece on this issue, After Auschwitz, held that the only intellectually honest response to the Holocaust is to reject God, and to recognize that all existence is ultimately meaningless. According to this piece, there is no divine plan or purpose, no God that reveals His will to humankind, and God does not care about the world. Humans must assert and create their own value in life. This view has been rejected by Jews of all religious denominations, but his works were widely read in the Jewish community in the 1970s. Since that time Rubenstein has begun to move away from this view; his later works affirm a form of deism in which one may believe that God may exist as the basis for reality and some also include Kabbalistic notions of the nature of God.

No man can really say that God is dead. How can we know that? Nevertheless, I am compelled to say that we live in the time of the "death of God". This is more a statement about man and his culture than about God. The death of God is a cultural fact ... When I say we live in the time of the death of God, I mean that the thread uniting God and man, heaven and earth, has been broken ...

Eliezer Berkovits
Eliezer Berkovits held that man's free will depends on God's decision to remain hidden. If God were to reveal himself in history and hold back the hand of tyrants, man's free will would be rendered non-existent. This is a view that is loosely based on the kabbalistic concept of nahama d'kissufa (bread of shame)- the idea that greater satisfaction is achieved when one becomes deserving of a blessing rather than when it is given as a gift. Kabbalah teaches that this is one of the reasons God created humans with free will and with obligations, and that in order to maintain that free will, God reduces the extent to which he manifests himself in the world (tzimtzum).

David Weiss Halivni
David Weiss Halivni, a Holocaust survivor from Hungary, says that the effort to associate the Shoah and sin is morally outrageous. He holds that it is unwarranted on a strict reading of the Tanakh. He claims that it reinforces an alarming tendency among ultra-Orthodox leaders to exploit such arguments on behalf of their own authority.  In "Prayer in the Shoah" he gives his response to the idea that the Holocaust was a punishment from God:

What happened in the Shoah is above and beyond measure (l'miskpat): above and beyond suffering, above and beyond any punishment. There is no transgression that merits such punishment... and it cannot be attributed to sin."

Elie Wiesel
A Romanian Jewish-American writer, professor, political activist, Nobel laureate, and Holocaust survivor Elie Wiesel was the author of 57 books, including Night, a work based on his experiences as a prisoner in the Auschwitz, Buna, and Buchenwald concentration camps. Wiesel's 1979 play The Trial of God is about a trial in which God is the defendant, and is reportedly based on events that Wiesel himself witnessed as a teenager in Auschwitz. Over the course of the trial, a number of arguments are made, both for and against God's guilt. Wiesel's theological stance, illustrated through the intuitive possibilities of literature, is a theology of existentialist protest, which neither denies God, nor accepts theodicies. Regarding the theme of protest in particular, Menachem Mendel Schneerson maintained a correspondence with Wiesel, urging him to perceive faith (emunah) as the transcendental precondition of authentic protest. In one of his books, Norman Lamm treats Wiesel's theological novel, The Town Beyond the Wall, to literary, theological and Judaic commentary. The novel's protagonists symbolically proceed through a range of theological views, which Wiesel's Midrashic-style literature can explore where theodicy fails. The ending sees the hope of renewed mystical reconciliation with God.

Post-Holocaust and child abuse theology
David R. Blumenthal, in his book Facing the Abusing God (1993), has drawn on data from the field of child abuse and has proposed "worship of God through protest" as a legitimate response of survivors of both the Holocaust and child abuse.

Another writer addressing survivors of the Holocaust and child abuse is John K. Roth, whose essay "A Theodicy of Protest" is included in Encountering Evil: Live Options in Theodicy (1982).

Works of important Christian theologians

Jürgen Moltmann
In The Crucified God Jürgen Moltmann speaks of how in a theology after Auschwitz the traditional notion of God needed to be revised:

Shattered and broken, the survivors of my generation were then returning from camps and hospitals to the lecture room. A theology which did not speak of God in the sight of the one who was abandoned and crucified would have had nothing to say to us then.

The traditional notion of an impassible  unmoved mover had died in those camps and was no longer tenable. Moltmann proposes instead a crucified God who is both a suffering and protesting God. That is, God is not detached from suffering but willingly enters into human suffering in compassion.

God in Auschwitz and Auschwitz in the crucified God – that is the basis for real hope that both embraces and overcomes the world.

This is in contrast both with the move of theism to justify God's actions and the move of atheism to accuse God. Moltmann's trinitarian theology of the cross instead says that God is a protesting God who opposes the gods of this world of power and domination by entering into human pain and suffering on the cross and on the gallows of Auschwitz.  Moltmann's theology of the cross was later developed into  liberation theologies from suffering people under Stalinism in Eastern Europe and military dictatorships in South America and South Korea.

Pope Benedict XVI
In the address given on the occasion of his visit to the extermination camp of Auschwitz, Pope Benedict XVI suggested a reading of the events of the Holocaust as motivated by a hatred of God himself. The address begins by acknowledging the impossibility of an adequate theological response:

Nonetheless, he proposes that the actions of the Nazis can be seen as having been motivated by a hatred of God and a desire to exalt human power, with the Holocaust serving as a means by which to erase witness to God and his Law:

Most coverage of the address was positive, with praise from Italian and Polish rabbis. The Simon Wiesenthal Center called the visit historic, and the address and prayers "a repudiation of antisemitism and a repudiation of those... who refer to the Holocaust as a myth".

Criticisms
A few Jewish commentators have objected to what they perceive as a desire to Christianize the Holocaust. There is debate as to whether Holocaust theology has contributed to the betterment of Jewish-Christian relations. Certain commentators have also criticized a tendency to historicize and dogmatize certain political or secular events such as the Holocaust, which are not part of theology as traditionally understood, with the effect of attempting both to locate God's activity within history, and to embed it within wider political rhetoric.

Yehuda Bauer considers Holocaust theology "fascinating" but a "dead end".

See also

 Dietrich Bonhoeffer
 Norman Finkelstein
 Maximilian Kolbe
 Dorothee Sölle
 Edith Stein
 Elie Wiesel

Notes

References

External links
 Holocaust theology site, "Works of important Jewish theologians"
 Audio: Dr. Walter Ziffer, Holocaust survivor and theology professor, discusses this article Hear Dr. Walter Ziffer (the last Holocaust survivor in Asheville, North Carolina as of April 11, 2004) discuss this article.
 The theological view of the Lubavitcher Rebbe to the Holocaust, and other Jewish responses
 The Center for Theological Reflection on the Holocaust
 Holocaust Prayer at the United States Capitol Rotunda, National Civic Commemoration of the Days of Remembrance of Victims of the Holocaust

 
20th-century Judaism
Jewish theology
The Holocaust
Theodicy